Villán de Tordesillas is a municipality located in the province of Valladolid, Castile and León, Spain. According to the 2004 census (INE), the municipality had a population of 176 inhabitants.

The town has a falangist councillor, formerly had a mayor affiliated with the Falange Española, and saw itself involved in an incident in 2018 involving the display of a Franco-era flag in the town hall's flagpost.

References

Municipalities in the Province of Valladolid